The sequence of two backslashes \\ may represent:

 the prefix of a Microsoft Windows UNC pathname
 an escaped backslash character